Rebecca Nana Adwoa Kwabi is a Ghanaian beauty queen and a fashion designer. She was crowned Miss Ghana in 2019 and represented Ghana at the Miss World 2019.

Early life and education 
Kwabi was born in Tema. She attended Teshie Presbyterian Senior High School and continued to study fashion designing at Bluecrest University College and Maureen's Signature Institute of Fashion.

Career 
Kwabi was crowned Miss Ghana in 2019. She was awarded Miss Skinned, Miss Top Model, Miss Photogenic and Miss Fitness at the Miss Ghana 2019. She represented Ghana at the Miss World 2019. She made Top 30 Miss World Beauty With A Purpose.

Kwabi has been featured in Poland Newspaper, Celopatra Magazine and Sharina Magazine.

References

External links 
 https://sharinaworld.com/rebecca-kwabi/

Miss World 2019 delegates
Living people
Ghanaian beauty pageant winners
Year of birth missing (living people)